George Edmondson may refer to:
 George Edmondson (baseball) (1896–1973), Major League Baseball pitcher
 George Edmondson (educationalist) (1798–1863), English educationalist
 George Edmondson Jr. (born 1922)

See also
 George Edmundson (1848–1930), clergyman and historian